The 1912 United States presidential election in Maryland took place on November 5, 1912, as part of the 1912 United States presidential election. State voters chose eight representatives, or electors, to the Electoral College, who voted for president and vice president.

Maryland was won by Princeton University President Woodrow Wilson (D–Virginia), running with governor of Indiana Thomas R. Marshall, with 48.57% of the popular vote, against the 26th president of the United States Theodore Roosevelt (P–New York), running with governor of California Hiram Johnson, with 24.91% of the popular vote and the 27th president of the United States William Howard Taft (R–Ohio), running with Columbia University President Nicholas Murray Butler, with 23.69% of the popular vote. , this is the first and only time that Garrett County did not support the Republican candidate. As of 2020, this is also the last time the Democratic candidate won Carroll County by more than 10%.

This was the first time since 1892 that a Democrat won the popular vote in Maryland.

Results

Results by county

Counties that flipped from Republican to Democratic
Allegany
Baltimore (City)
Frederick
St. Mary's
Washington

Counties that flipped from Republican to Progressive
Garrett

See also
 United States presidential elections in Maryland
 1912 United States presidential election
 1912 United States elections

Notes

References 

Maryland
1912
Presidential